The Vulture is a 1967 horror film directed by Lawrence Huntington and starring Robert Hutton, Akim Tamiroff, Broderick Crawford, and Diane Clare.

Plot
One stormy night in Cornwall, schoolteacher Ellen West becomes hysterical when she sees a gigantic bird with a human face fly out of the open grave of Francis Real, an 18th-century seaman. Real, buried alive with a huge, murderous bird he had found in the South Pacific, had sworn vengeance on all descendants of Squire Stroud, the man who ordered his interment; nevertheless, Brian Stroud, the present squire, is unconcerned by the prophecy of doom.

American scientist Eric Lutyens, husband of Brian's niece Trudy, is troubled when he finds the mutilated body of a sheep in what appears to be a vulture's nest. He visits Professor Koniglich, a scientist friend of Brian's who believes himself to be a descendant of Real, and correctly surmises that Koniglich had attempted to disintegrate his own body in the grave and reassemble it through nuclear energy; unfortunately, the professor had failed to consider the bird buried there, and a mutation resulted.

Before Eric can warn the Strouds, Brian and his brother Edward are found dead on a cliffside, and Trudy is carried away to the same site by the bird after she is lured to Koniglich's house. At the cliff, Eric finds his wife threatened by the beast with Koniglich's head and screams at her to use the gun he had given her. Trudy shoots the bird and it crashes to its death on the rocks below; Eric then weights it with an anchor, tows it out to sea, and sinks it.

Cast
 Robert Hutton as Dr. Eric Lutens
 Akim Tamiroff as Prof. Hans Koniglich/the Vulture
 Broderick Crawford as Brian F. Stroud
 Diane Clare as Trudy Lutens
 Philip Friend as The Vicar
 Patrick Holt as Jarvis
 Annette Carell as Ellen West
 Edward Caddick as Melcher, the Sexton
 Gordon Sterne as Edward Stroud
 Keith McConnell as Superintendent Wendell
 Margaret Robinson as the Nurse

Production
The script was based on an original story by Huntington which was first known as Manutara. He sold it to producer Jack O. Lamont who managed to get some financing from Paramount provided American names were cast in the leads. The remainder of the £50,000 budget was raised from Britain's Homeric Films and NFFC along with Canada's Ihod Productions.

Reception

TV Guide awarded the film one out of four stars, writing " Ridiculous casting makes this one a laugh riot."
On his website Fantastic Movie Musings and Ramblings, Dave Sindelar called it "ludicrous", criticizing the film's monster, backstory, and what he called a"budget-strapped threadbare look".

References

External links
 
 

1967 films
Films directed by Lawrence Huntington
1967 horror films
Paramount Pictures films
Horror films about birds
Giant monster films
American monster movies
British monster movies
Canadian monster movies
English-language Canadian films
British black-and-white films
American black-and-white films
Canadian black-and-white films
Films scored by Eric Spear
1960s English-language films
1960s American films
1960s Canadian films
1960s British films